The Great Yorkshire Railway Preservation Society was a short-lived preservation scheme, based in Starbeck, North Yorkshire in England. It was formed in 1980 with the aim of restoring part of the Leeds-Northallerton Railway and based at the former  loco shed, then owned by Octavius Atkinson steel works. The steel works closed in 1989, and the group moved to the Yorkshire Museum of Farming at Murton, near York, where they went on to successfully restore part of the former Derwent Valley Light Railway.

References

Heritage railways in Yorkshire